Karaçayır is a village in the Çelikhan District, Adıyaman Province, Turkey. The village had a population of 82 in 2021.

References

Villages in Çelikhan District
Kurdish settlements in Adıyaman Province